Diego Vargas may refer to:
Diego Vargas (bishop) (died 1633), Italian bishop
Diego Vargas (footballer) (born 1998), Spanish footballer